Sekuoia is the moniker of the Danish electronic musician and producer Patrick Alexander Bech Madsen (born 1992).
Sekuoias first EP "Trips" was released in 2011 and started a small buzz in the electronic music scene in Denmark and Germany.

History 
Born in Düsseldorf, and with a childhood in Detroit, Sekuoia first moved to Denmark at an age of 8 years. Throughout his teens, he built himself a studio in his parents basement, where he would go on to make his ambient and lingering electronica. 
Sekuoia combines the organic with the electronic in a dreamy meltdown.

Furthermore, Sekuoia has been on the musicschool Engelsholm back in 2012, where he has met some of his current friends and colleagues Smerz, Chinah and Code Walk.

Career 
Sekuoia's music has been described as; combining the organic with the electronic in a dreamy meltdown, consisting of dry beats, synth washes and copy/pasted vocals conjure echoes of both dubstep and atmospheric ambient.

Sekuoia has been chosen to support acts like Inc, Washed Out, MØ and WhoMadeWho, as well as remixing Tomas Barfod.

Sekuoia has played in more than 20 European countries, including appearances at festivals like Roskilde Festival, Amsterdam Dance Event, Eurosonic Festival, Trans Musicales, Spot Festival, by:larm

Discography 
EP's:
 Trips (2011)
 Faces (2012)
 Reset Heart (2015)

Studioalbum:
 flac (2016)

Quotes about Sekuoia 
 Clash Magazine: ”Gorgeous, expansive, ambitious (…) fast rising producer”
 Line of Best Fit: ”Seducing your senses”
 Beatport: “Sekuoia is Denmark’s finest electronic

References

1992 births
Living people
Danish electronic musicians